Richard P. Simmons, known as "Dick", was born May 3rd, 1931 and went to Massachusetts Institute of Technology (MIT) in 1949.  He became a metallurgist at the Allegheny Ludlum Steel corporation in Pittsburgh.  He then worked for other steel companies before returning to become the chief executive of Allegheny, taking it public and then leading a management buyout.  Having become wealthy, he then created a variety of endowments at MIT.

References 

1931 births
Possibly living people
Metallurgists